Necromantia was a Greek black metal band that was founded in 1989 in Athens. Alongside Rotting Christ and Varathron, they are considered to be pioneers in establishing the Greek black metal scene in the early 1990s. The band is notable for the complete lack of rhythm guitar in their music, which is substituted by an eight-string bass guitar. Another notable feature is the band's frequent use of musical instruments not usually associated with black metal, such as the saxophone and flute.

In November 2019, following the death of founding member Baron Blood, Necromantia announced it would disband after a final, commemorative album titled To the Depths We Descend....

History 
Necromantia was founded in 1989 by George "The Magus" Zacharopoulos (formerly known as "Magus Wampyr Daoloth", as well as "Morbid" when collaborating with Rotting Christ) in bass/vocals and Makis "Baron Blood" Kanakaris in 8-string bass. The two have been the only consistent members of the band throughout its history, with other instruments handled by session musicians.

Necromantia's official debut, Crossing the Fiery Path, was released in 1993 through the French label Osmose Productions. Their second full-length, Scarlet Evil Witching Black, came out in 1995, while a mini-CD, the pagan-themed Ancient Pride, followed in 1997.  After parting ways with Osmose, The Magus and company returned in 2000 with IV Malice, this time on the Greek label Black Lotus Records. Black Lotus also re-issued the band's previous albums in various forms, as well as a compilation album titled Covering Evil (12 Years Doing the Devil's Work).  The band reportedly worked on an album in 2003, under the working title Temple of the Skull. It was never released and probably never recorded.  Necromantia's next full-length album was The Sound of Lucifer Storming Heaven, released by Dockyard 1 Records in 2007.  The band's subsequent works have mostly been compilations of their demo works and other unreleased early material, as well as split LPs with other Greek black and death metal acts.

In November 20, 2019, The Magus announced through the band's official Facebook page that fellow founding member Baron Blood had died. In subsequent announcements, he stated that the band will release a final album (originally planned to be a commemorative EP, but was then expanded to a full-length), in Baron Blood's memory, titled To the Depths We Descend.... Following this release, Necromantia will be disbanded, and no further material will be released.

To the Depths We Descend... was released in October 15 2021. The album contains six new songs and re-recordings of two classic songs from the band's early demos. A number of previous band members make guest appearances to commemorate Baron Blood. Notably, it is the only Necromantia album not featuring an eight-string bass, which is substituted by standard rhythm guitar parts. This decision was made, according to The Magus, because “the use of the 8-string bass belongs to Baron Blood and it will remain with him”.

Necromantia was officially dissolved in December 2021, with The Magus stating that "The band has now descended into the Abyss."

Members

Last line-up
 George "The Magus" Zacharopoulos - bass, vocals
George Emmanuel - guitars, keyboards
Yannis Votsis - drums

Former members
 Baron Blood - 8-String Bass (died 20.11.2019)
Fotis Benardo (Fotis Giannakopoulos) (ex-Septic Flesh) - drums
 Slow Death - backing vocals, howling, growling and whispers
 Yiannis ”The Worshipper Of Pan” Papayiannis - sax, percussions, keyboards, tablas, classical guitar, flute
 Inferno - synths, piano
 Iraklis Yalantzides - keyboards (session)
 Lambros Sfiris - keyboards (session)
 Divad (aka Dave P.) - guitar
 John Fiorentis - guitar (session)
 Nick Adams - drums (session)
 George Panou - drums (session)

Discography

Demos
 Promo Tape 1990 (1990)
 Vampiric Rituals (1992)
 Demo '93 (1993)
 Promo 1993 (1993)

Albums
 Crossing the Fiery Path (Osmose, 1993)
 Scarlet Evil Witching Black (Osmose, 1995)
 IV: Malice (Black Lotus, 2000)
 The Sound of Lucifer Storming Heaven (Dockyard 1, 2007)
 To the Depths We Descend... (The Circle Music, 2021)

EPs / split-LPs
 The Black Arts / The Everlasting Sins (split with Varathron; Black Power, 1992)
From The Past We Summon Thee (Dark Side, 1995)
 Ancient Pride (Osmose, 1997)
 People of the Sea (Dark Side, 2008)
 ...For the Temple of the Serpent Skull... (split with Acherontas; Dark Side, 2008)
Nekromanteion - A Collection of Arcane Hexes (split with Necromancy; Soulseller, 2014)
Primordial Evil (split with Rotting Christ; Black Vomit, 2017)

Compilations
 Covering Evil (12 Years Doing The Devil's Work) (Black Lotus, 2001)
 Cults of the Shadow (contains Crossing the Fiery Path and Scarlet Evil Witching Black; Osmose, 2002)
 Necromantia (boxed set containing Crossing the Fiery Path, Scarlet Evil Witching Black, Ancient Pride and IV: Malice; Black Lotus, 2006)
 De Magia Veterum (Dark Side Records, 2009)
Chthonic Years / Demo Collection (Lvx Infernvm 2018)

References

External links
 Necromantia biography @ MusicMight
 [ Necromantia biography @ Allmusic]

1989 establishments in Greece
2021 disestablishments in Greece
Greek black metal musical groups
Musical groups established in 1989
Musical groups disestablished in 2021
Musical groups from Athens
Greek musical trios